Kalpana Bista  (15 April 1905 – 11 June 2001) was the first female minister of education of Nepal in 1978.

She was born in Kathmandu to an aristocratic family in the Rana Dynasty. Bista was appointed by late King Birendra of Nepal and late Prime Minister Surya Bahadur Thapa as the minister of education as well as the member of the Office of the secretariat and parliament on multiple occasions.

She was also appointed as a lifetime member of the child welfare committee of the state of Uttarakhand in India.

Personal life 
She was married in to the Bista family that originates in the far western region of Nepal.

Many members of her family including her son and father-in-law as well as most of her brother-in-laws have held public office in the government of Nepal. Her son Lok Pratap Bista was also appointed by King Mahendra of Nepal as the Minister of Forestry and Agriculture.

References 

Women government ministers of Nepal
Education ministers of Nepal
1905 births
2001 deaths
People from Dadeldhura District
20th-century Nepalese women politicians
20th-century Nepalese politicians